United Nations Security Council resolution 1259, adopted unanimously on 11 August 1999, after recalling resolutions  808 (1993), 827 (1993), 936 (1994), 955 (1994) and 1047 (1996), the Council appointed Carla Del Ponte as Prosecutor at the International Criminal Tribunal for Rwanda (ICTR) and the International Criminal Tribunal for the former Yugoslavia (ICTY).

The Council noted the resignation of the former Prosecutor, Louise Arbour, with effect from 15 September 1999, and decided that term of Carla Del Ponte, a Swiss attorney general, would begin on that date.

See also
 Bosnian Genocide
 Rwandan genocide
 List of United Nations Security Council Resolutions 1201 to 1300 (1998–2000)
 Yugoslav Wars

References

External links
 
Text of the Resolution at undocs.org

 1259
1999 in Yugoslavia
1999 in Rwanda
 1259
 1259
August 1999 events